Bourj Football Club is a football club based in Bourj el-Barajneh, Beirut, Lebanon, that competes in the . Founded in 1967, the club has won one Lebanese FA Cup in 1993 and one Lebanese Challenge Cup in 2019.

Nicknamed the "Leader of Dahieh", in 2019 the club was promoted to the Lebanese Premier League for the first time in 16 years.

History 
In 1993 Bourj, captained by Mohammad Ismail, won the final the Lebanese FA Cup 4–1 after extra time, against Homenmen. Mallarby and Hassan Rahhal scored a brace each, while Papken Melikian scored the sole goal for the opposing team. This was the second replay of the final, after both previous encounters ended in a draw after extra time. In 2008, Bourj FC were relegated to the Fourth Division.

On 1 August 2021, Bourj won the Lebanese Challenge Cup for the second time, beating Tripoli in the 2021 final; they refused to attend the crowing ceremony, following a verbal altercation between Fadi Nasser, Bourj's president, and a member of the Lebanese Football Association (LFA)'s executive committee. On 2 August, the LFA imposed a fine of £L22 million on the club. The same day, Bourj announced their withdrawal from the Lebanese Premier League through their social media, and that they would not pay the fine imposed. They eventually took part in the 2020–21 season.

Supporters 
Founded as the first club in the area, Bourj is considered to be the representative of all the families of the town. Following the introduction of ultras groups in Lebanon in 2018, "Ultras Borjawi" was formed at the start of the 2018–19 Lebanese Second Division season.

Bourj supporters tend to be seen as the 12th man for their team, as they attend in good figures to their club’s games.

Club rivalries 
Bourj's main rival have historically been Shabab Sahel, as they both fight for supremacy over the Dahieh suburbs. The match has been dubbed the Dahieh derby. Another important rivalry is with Shabab Bourj, due to the fact that they are both based in the Bourj el-Barajneh district.

Players

Current squad

Honours 
 Lebanese FA Cup
 Winners (1): 1992–93
Lebanese Challenge Cup
Winners (2; record): 2019, 2021
Lebanese Second Division
Winners (3): 1990–91, 2000–01, 2018–19
Lebanese Third Division
Winners (1): 2016–17

See also 
 List of football clubs in Lebanon

Notes

References

External links 

Bourj FC at LebanonFG

 
Football clubs in Lebanon
Sport in Beirut
1967 establishments in Lebanon
Organisations based in Beirut
Association football clubs established in 1967